Events in the year 2009 in Belgium.

Incumbents
Monarch: Albert II
Prime Minister: Herman Van Rompuy to 15 November; from 25 November Yves Leterme

Events
January
 4 January – Johan Bonny consecrated as bishop of Antwerp.
 23 January – Dendermonde nursery attack

February
 11 February – With 5,000 present, the Fortis shareholders' meeting to vote on the break-up and sale of the company to the Dutch and Belgian governments was the largest shareholders' meeting in Belgian history.
 26 February – Franco-Belgian bank Dexia announces 3.3 billion euros of net losses for 2008.

March
 4 March – Association belge des familles des disparus (founded 1948) wound up.

October
 11 October – Father Damien canonised by Pope Benedict XVI, in the presence of King Albert II, Queen Paola, and Herman Van Rompuy.

November
 15 November – Herman Van Rompuy resigns as Prime Minister in order to become President of the European Council; Van Rompuy Government ends.
 25 November – Leterme II Government sworn in.

Deaths
 4 January - Lei Clijsters (52), footballer, father of Kim Clijsters.
 2 February - Louis Proost (73), cyclist.
 4 March - Patricia De Martelaere (51), writer.
 18 March – Rita Lejeune (102), medievalist
 6 March - Henri Pousseur (79), composer.

See also
2009 in Belgian television

References

 
Belgium
Years of the 21st century in Belgium
2000s in Belgium
Belgium